AZS AWF Poznań is a Polish sports club based in Poznań. The women's volleyball team played in the Polish Seria A Women's Volleyball League. However, on 6 April 2009, the club sold its license to play in the second league club and now operates as KS Piecobiogaz Murowana Goślina. It is non-existent from the season 2009/2010. The club also has a field hockey section.

2003/2004 season
8th place in Seria A.

2004/2005 season
The team will play Seria A.

See also
 Volleyball in Poland
 Sports in Poland

Women's volleyball teams in Poland
Sport in Poznań
Polish field hockey clubs